Metasia exculta is a moth in the family Crambidae. It was described by Edward Meyrick in 1934. It is found in the Democratic Republic of the Congo, where it has been recorded from Katanga and Équateur.

References

Moths described in 1934
Metasia